Newcastle-under-Lyme is a constituency in northern Staffordshire created in 1354 and represented in the House of Commons of the UK Parliament since 2019 by Aaron Bell of the Conservative Party. It was the last to be co-represented by a member of the Conservative Party when it was dual-member, before the 1885 general election which followed the Redistribution of Seats Act 1885 coupled with the Reform Act 1884. In 1919 the local MP,  Josiah Wedgwood, shifted his allegiance from the Liberal Party — the Lloyd George Coalition Liberals allying with the Conservatives — to the Labour Party and the seat elected the Labour candidate who has stood at each election for the next hundred years, a total of 29 elections in succession. Labour came close to losing the seat in 1969, 1986, 2015 and 2017, and eventually lost the seat in 2019.

Its 2017 general election result was the fifth-closest result, a winning margin of 30 votes. In 2019, it was subsequently won by the Conservatives for the first time since its creation, by over 7,000 votes.

Newcastle-under-Lyme is one of twelve Staffordshire seats won (held or gained) by a Conservative candidate in 2019 out of a total of twelve covering the county.

History 
From its creation in 1354, Newcastle-under-Lyme returned two MPs to the House of Commons. Under the Redistribution of Seats Act 1885, the constituency's representation was cut to one member.

Prominent frontbenchers or members
Josiah Wedgwood of the pottery family was repeatedly elected to the seat from 1906 until he was ennobled to join the Lords in 1942, as 1st Baron Wedgwood and campaigned in the United States for that country to join World War II and for Indian Independence; he was among many Liberals and their supporters deserting the party in or around 1918 due to the steering of David Lloyd George to the right and inviting Conservatives into government with him. Before the 20th century the constituency was often influenced and represented by members of the Leveson, Leveson-Gower and related Egerton family who owned in this constituency the Trentham estate - their most important MP was the Viscount Trentham who obtained a Dukedom.

Summary of results
This constituency had been a loyal Labour Party seat having returned a Labour MP in all 29 elections since 1918 and specifically since 1922 when MP Wedgwood defected from the Liberal Party to the Labour Party — his was among a great series of defections at this time see for example ex-Prime Minister H. H. Asquith's strong criticism of the Coalition Liberals particularly David Lloyd George. The 2015 result gave the seat the 9th-smallest majority of Labour's 232 seats by percentage of majority and 3rd-lowest in 2017. The Conservatives took six seats from Labour in 2017, and this seat was the second closest to being taken that was held, behind Dudley North, where the result was a Labour majority of 22 votes.

Results of candidates of other parties
In 2015 one of four other parties' candidates standing, UKIP's Wood, won more than 5% of the vote in 2015 therefore keeping his deposit, the party which campaigned consistently for the public vote for leaving the European Union in 2016. In 2017 the three largest British parties fielded candidates only — Labour, Conservative and Liberal Democrat candidates in order of votes won.

Turnout since 1945
Turnout has ranged from 87.6% in 1950 to 58.8% in 2001.

Boundaries 

The constituency includes most of the northerly parts of Newcastle-under-Lyme borough, primarily Newcastle-under-Lyme town plus Keele and Audley.

Parliament accepted the Boundary Commission's Fifth Periodic Review of Westminster constituencies for General Election 2010 since which it has electoral wards, with no alterations in that review:
Audley and Bignall End; Bradwell; Chesterton; Clayton; Cross Heath; Halmerend; Holditch; Keele; Knutton and Silverdale; May Bank; Porthill; Seabridge; Silverdale and Parksite; Thistleberry; Town; Westlands; and Wolstanton in the Borough of Newcastle-under-Lyme

From 1983-2010 the constituency comprised the following wards of the Borough of Newcastle-under-Lyme, namely, Audley and Bignall End, Bradwell, Chesterton, Clayton, Cross Heath, Halmerend, Holditch, Keele, May Bank, Porthill, Seabridge, Silverdale, Thistleberry, Town, Westlands and Wolstanton.

1885–1918: The existing parliamentary borough, so much of the municipal borough of Newcastle-under-Lyme as was not already included in the parliamentary borough, the local government district of Tunstall, and so much of the parish of Wolstanton as lay south of a line drawn along the centre of the road leading west from Chatterley railway station to the boundary of Audley parish.

Members of Parliament

MPs 1353–1509 
Where the name of the member has not yet been ascertained or is not recorded in a surviving document, the entry unknown is entered in the table.

Burgesses in the English Parliament 1510-1707 
As there were sometimes significant gaps between Parliaments held in this period, the dates of first assembly and dissolution are given.

The Roman numerals after some names are those used in The House of Commons 1509-1558 and The House of Commons 1558-1603 to distinguish a member from another politician of the same name.

MPs 1660–1885

MPs since 1885

Elections

Elections in the 2010s

Elections in the 2000s

Elections in the 1990s

Elections in the 1980s 

 Resignation of John Golding on 24 June 1986, upon appointment as General Secretary of the National Communications Union.

Elections in the 1970s

Elections in the 1960s

Elections in the 1950s

Elections in the 1940s

Elections in the 1930s

Elections in the 1920s

Election results 1868-1918

Elections in the 1860s

Elections in the 1870s

 

 

Buckley resigned, causing a by-election.

Elections in the 1880s

Elections in the 1890s

Elections in the 1900s

Elections in the 1910s 

General Election 1914/15:

Another General Election was required to take place before the end of 1915. The political parties had been making preparations for an election to take place and by July 1914, the following candidates had been selected; 
Liberal: Josiah Wedgwood
Unionist: Edgar Percy Hewitt

 Wedgwood was issued with a Coalition Coupon but did not accept it. He was also adopted by the local Liberal association, but considered himself an independent candidate.

Election results 1832-1868

Elections in the 1830s

Elections in the 1840s

  
 

 
 

Harris' election was declared void on petition on 11 May 1842, due to bribery by his agent, causing a by-election.

 

 

 

Harris' election was again declared void on 23 July 1842, due to bribery by his agents, and Colquhoun was declared elected in his place.

  
 
 
 

 
 

Christy resigned by accepting the office of Steward of the Chiltern Hundreds due to holding a government contract, causing a by-election in which he stood.

Elections in the 1850s

Elections in the 1860s

Pre-1832 election results

Elections in the 1830s

See also 
 1986 Newcastle-under-Lyme by-election
 List of parliamentary constituencies in Staffordshire

Notes

References

Sources 
 The History of Parliament: the House of Commons - Newcastle-under-Lyme, Borough, 1386 to 1831
 Britain Votes/Europe Votes By-Election Supplement 1983-, compiled and edited by F.W.S. Craig (Parliamentary Research Services 1985-)

Politics of the Borough of Newcastle-under-Lyme
Parliamentary constituencies in Staffordshire
Constituencies of the Parliament of the United Kingdom established in 1354